Scott C. Patterson (1969 – January 25, 2004) was a Canadian professional curler, from Pembroke, Ontario. Patterson was the only man to skip two North Bay rinks to the Brier - 1994 and '99. He also went was a member of the 1993 Northern Ontario mixed team.  Also, while attending University in Sudbury, at Laurentian University, he won the Ontario Universities' Championship.  Scott Patterson was a longtime member of the North Bay Granite Club.

Patterson was injured in a vehicle accident on January 23, 2004, while riding with Greg Cantin, John McClelland and Gerry Cantin, while on their way to attend the Northern Ontario Curling Association's challenge round.  While the other passengers survived, Patterson died in Sudbury, Ontario, at St. Joseph's Health Care Centre at 10:30 AM Eastern Standard Time. Scott was survived by his wife Tracy, a daughter Taylor, aged 5, and a son William, aged 2.

Teams

References

1969 births
2004 deaths
Curlers from Northern Ontario
Sportspeople from Greater Sudbury
Sportspeople from Pembroke, Ontario
Road incident deaths in Canada
Accidental deaths in Ontario
Canadian male curlers